The 1995 World Men's Curling Championship (branded as 1995 Ford World Men's Curling Championship for sponsorship reasons) was held at the Keystone Centre in Brandon, Manitoba, Canada from April 8–16, 1995.

Teams

Round-robin standings

Round-robin results

Draw 1

Draw 2

Draw 3

Draw 4

Draw 5

Draw 6

Draw 7

Draw 8

Draw 9

Tiebreakers

Round 1

Round 2

Playoffs

Brackets

Final

References
 

Ford
Ford
Curling competitions in Brandon, Manitoba
World Men's Curling Championship
April 1995 sports events in Canada
International curling competitions hosted by Canada